The following is an incomplete list of festivals in China, of all types.

Festivals in China

Cold Food Festival
Dongzhi Festival
Duanwu Festival
Freespace Fest
Fu Yang Festival
Harbin International Ice and Snow Sculpture Festival
Hong Kong Arts Festival
Lantern Festival
Litang Horse Festival
Longtaitou Festival
Lunar New Year Fair
Lychee and Dog Meat Festival
Miao Flower Mountain Festival
Mid-Autumn Festival
Monkey King Festival
Nadun
Nian Li
Nine Emperor Gods Festival
Qingdao International Beer Festival
Qingming Festival
Qinhuai Lantern Fair
Qintong Boat Festival
Renri
Third Month Fair
Torch Festival
Uyghur Doppa Cultural Festival
Water-Sprinkling Festival
Weifang International Kite Festival

Film festivals in China

List of film festivals in China

Music festivals in China

Beijing Jazz Festival
Beijing Music Festival
Beijing Pop Festival
Clockenflap
Great Wall International Music Academy
Hong Kong Green Jazz Festival
Hush!! Full Band Festival
Intro Music Festival 
Live Earth concert, Shanghai
Midi Music Festival
Modern Sky Festival
Yue Festival

See also
List of festivals in Asia#China

External links

 China
China
 China
 China
 Festivals